Patrick Platins (born 19 April 1983) is a German former professional footballer who played as a goalkeeper.

Career 
Platins was born in Immenstadt. He began to play for VfL Wolfsburg II, the reserve team of VfL Wolfsburg in 2002. In a short time he got his first professional contract and became the third or fourth reserve goalkeeper of the first team but he was not able to gain a match for the first team in the Bundesliga.

In 2008, Platins was loaned to FC Augsburg for half a year but did not play. At the beginning of 2009–10 season he returned to VfL Wolfsburg, where he only played for the reserve team again.

After the season his contract was not renewed. In February 2010, he joined Arminia Bielefeld, after the reserve goalkeeper Rowen Fernandez was injured during a match. In the last matchday of 2009–10 season he made his debut in the 2. Bundesliga.

References

External links 
 

1983 births
Living people
People from Immenstadt
Sportspeople from Swabia (Bavaria)
German footballers
Footballers from Bavaria
Association football goalkeepers
2. Bundesliga players
3. Liga players
VfL Wolfsburg players
VfL Wolfsburg II players
FC Augsburg players
Arminia Bielefeld players
SV Darmstadt 98 players